The Lindsey Stirling Christmas Program was a 2021 North American concert tour by violinist Lindsey Stirling. This was her fourth Christmas tour, in part celebrating her album Warmer in the Winter.

Background
In 2017, Stirling released the Christmas album Warmer in the Winter and toured that December. It became an annual occurrence with the Wanderland Tour (2018) and the Warmer in the Winter Tour (2019). With the COVID-19 pandemic leaving her unable to tour in 2020, Stirling performed a festive "Lindsey Stirling: Home for the Holidays" live stream concert.

The Lindsey Stirling Christmas Program was a 22-day concert tour across North America. It began in Memphis, Tennessee, on 26 November and concluded on December 23 in Jackson, Mississippi.

Set list
The following set list is representative of the show in Huntsville, Alabama on December 21, 2021. It is not representative of all concerts for the duration of the tour.

 "All I Want for Christmas Is You"
 "Christmas C'Mon"
 "Warmer in the Winter"
 "Let It Snow! Let It Snow! Let It Snow!""
 "Jingle Bell Rock"
 "I Saw Three Ships (Come Sailing In)"
 "Jingle Bells / Deck the Halls / It's Beginning to Look Like Christmas / Feliz Navidad / Hedwig's Theme / Grandma Got Ran Over by a Reindeer"
 "The Devil Went Down to Georgia"
 "Sleigh Ride"
 "Angels We Have Heard on High"
 "Crystallize"
 "Hallelujah"
 "Dance of the Sugar Plum Fairy"
 "Santa Baby"
 "Carol of the Bells"
 "We Three Gentlemen"
 "You're a Mean One, Mr. Grinch"

 Encore
 "I Wonder as I Wander"

Reception
Reception to the tour was very positive. The Lantern commended the mixture of arrangements Stirling achieved with the songs, and also the quality of dancing and lighting describing it as a feast for the senses. Meanwhile, the Wichita Eagle of Kansas City commended Stirling's performance and variety of the show, noting that her Chihuahua made a guest appearance.

Tour dates

Personnel
Band
Lindsey Stirling – violin
Drew Steen – drums
Ryan Riveros – keyboards

Dancers
 Addie Byers
 Taylor Gagliano
 Jessica Richens
 Kailyn Rogers

References

2021 concert tours
Lindsey Stirling concert tours